Jean Alain Roussel (born 1951 in Port Louis, Mauritius) is a Musician, Composer, Record Producer,  Arranger, Educator and 'Music and Life Coach'.

He is best known for keyboard work from the 1970s through today, playing regularly with Cat Stevens (e.g. "Peace Train", "Bitter Blue", "Oh Very Young","Tuesday's Dead", "Wild World", "Where Do The Children Play", "Sitting", "Catch Bull At Four", "Teaser & The Firecat"), recording and arranging on Ghost in the Machine, with The Police (e.g. "Every Little Thing She Does Is Magic", 1981), Composer of Rick Ross's Grammy Nominated,  "Ashamed" and Wilson Pickett's "Shameless", recipient Jacques d'Honneur Award 2022 at Cours Florent (France), as well as performing a variety of roles with dozens of others (e.g. Paul Kossoff, Thin Lizzy, Roy Buchanan, Bob Marley and The Wailers, Osibisa, Elkie Brooks, Paul Rodgers, John Martyn, Alan White,
Roger Glover, Gary Moore,  Ron Wood, Cheryl Lynn, Sting, Dusty Springfield, Paul Simon, Rick Ross, Celine Dion, Suzi Quatro, Robert Palmer, Bob Marley, 10cc, Don Everly, Jon Hendricks, John Paul Jones, Donovan, Pappo's Blues, Astor Piazzolla, Joan Armatrading, Tony Levin, Junior Marvin, Joe Cocker, Jimmy Cliff, Olivia Newton-John, Peter Frampton etc.).

Credits

Awards
Félix Award (1987) for arranging "Comme un cœur froid" and was nominated for two other Félix Awards for producing and engineering "Incognito."
Platinum Album Award (1982) for arrangement and keyboards on Ghost in the Machine ~ The Police
Platinum Album Award (1984) for contribution to Legend ~ Bob Marley and The Wailers
Grammy Nomination (2013) –  Songwriter of the Year ~ Rap Music "Ashamed" by Rick Ross

References

External links

Discography, discogs.com

1951 births
Living people
Mauritian musicians
Mauritian composers
Male composers
People from Port Louis District
Mauritian record producers
Mauritian expatriates in the United Kingdom
Keyboardists
Music arrangers
Male pianists
21st-century pianists
21st-century male musicians